This is a list of schools of higher education in Katowice.

Katowice is a large scientific centre. It has over 20 schools of higher education, at which over 100,000 people study.

University of Silesia in Katowice
Krzysztof Kieślowski Faculty of Radio and Television, also named Katowice Film School or Krzysztof Kieślowski Film School in Katowice
University of Economics in Katowice
University of Music in Katowice
University of Sports in Katowice
Academy of Fine Arts in Katowice
Medical University of Silesia in Katowice
Silesian University of Technology - Faculty of Materials Science and Metallurgy and Transport
University of Social Sciences and Humanities - Faculty of Psychology
Polish Academy of Sciences
International Higher School of Political Sciences
International Higher School of Banking and Finances
Silesian International Business Higher School
Silesian Higher School of Computer Science
Silesian Higher School of Management
Uppersilesian Higher School of Trade
Higher School of Banking and Finances
Higher School of Humanistic Science
Higher School of Technical Science
Higher School of Computer Technologies
Higher School the Pedagogical TWP in Warsaw, the Institute of Pedagogy in Katowice
Higher School of Social Skills in Poznań (department in Katowice)
Higher School of Humanistic - Economic in Łódź (department in Katowice)
Higher School of Marketing Management and Foreign Languages
Higher School of Management the Protection of Work
Silesian Higher Clerical Seminary
Theological Seminar of Franciscans in Katowice-Panewniki
Private Teachers' College of Foreign Languages
Private Teachers' Board of Foreign Languages in Bielsko-Biała (department in Katowice).

References

Katowice
Education in Poland